Michell Carvalho Machado (born September 1, 1981 in Parintins), known as Michell Parintins, is a Brazilian footballer who plays as midfielder for Princesa do Solimões. He already played for national competitions such as Copa do Brasil, Campeonato Brasileiro Série B, Campeonato Brasileiro Série C and Campeonato Brasileiro Série D.

Career statistics

References

External links

1981 births
Living people
Brazilian footballers
Association football midfielders
Campeonato Brasileiro Série B players
Campeonato Brasileiro Série C players
Campeonato Brasileiro Série D players
Associação Desportiva Recreativa e Cultural Icasa players
Paysandu Sport Club players
Nacional Futebol Clube players
Sportspeople from Amazonas (Brazilian state)